The Lester Patterson Houses or Patterson Houses is a public housing development in the Mott Haven neighborhood of the Bronx, New York City. It was named after Bronx assemblyman and judge Lester W. Patterson. It is one of the largest New York City Housing Authority (NYCHA) complexes in the city with fifteen buildings 6 and 13-stories tall and 1,790 apartments.

Development 
Construction on the Patterson Houses began in 1948 and were a part of a large push to build public housing developments in the five boroughs. It was the first low rent development completed in the Bronx since World War II and the first families moved into the development in March 1950 with priority for veterans. It was completed on December 31, 1950 and named after judge Lester Patterson (1893–1947). The development's playground was later completed in 1953, and was used by the adjacent school P.S. 13 during school hours.

Tenants of the development in the 1950s were a diverse mix of people from the South, Caribbean, and Puerto Rico. They introduced each other to their cultures including food and music. Many inter-ethnic marriages resulted from the fusion of cultures.

By the early 1960s, crime in NYCHA developments had risen and the agency added extra detectives to help control crime at 28 developments including Patterson. By the late 1960s, tenants felt that policing was inadequate in the development and an increase in muggings and burglaries due to drugs being found on the site and went on strike by withholding rent from the agency. NYCHA took the tenants to court and the judge sided with the agency citing state law that lack of police presence wasn't a violation that tenants could withhold rent for. This resulted in tenants paying $25,000 in back rent.

Notable residents
 Dorothy Johnson was the very first Resident to move into Patterson Projects in 1950. Allen Jones, (born 1950), author. 
A.G., rapper of Showbiz and A.G.
Nathaniel "Tiny" Archibald (born 1948), former NBA player
Oxiris Barbot, Commissioner of Health of the City of New York
Iran "The Blade" Barkley (born 1960), boxer
Angelo Cruz (born 1958), Puerto Rican professional basketball player
Guy Fisher (born 1947), convicted racketeer and owner of the Apollo Theater
Percee P (born 1969), rapper
Barry Rogers (1935–1991), salsa musician and jazz fusion trombonist
Prince Royce (born 1989), Latin musical artist
Mayor

See also
New York City Housing Authority
List of New York City Housing Authority properties

References

Residential buildings in the Bronx
Public housing in the Bronx
Robert Moses projects
Residential buildings completed in 1950
Mott Haven, Bronx